Shake It Up: I Love Dance (stylized as Shake It Up: I <3 Dance, also known as Shake It Up: I ♥ Dance) is the third and final soundtrack for the Disney Channel Original Series Shake It Up. It was released on March 5, 2013. The soundtrack is based on songs featured on the show's third (and final) season (2012-2013). The album features the following musical artists associated with or popularized by Disney Channel, Bella Thorne, Zendaya, Bridgit Mendler, McClain Sisters, Caroline Sunshine, Roshon Fegan, Selena Gomez, Coco Jones, Olivia Holt and Dove Cameron, as well as non-Disney Channel stars Young L.A. (BG5), Drew Seeley, TKO, SOS and Nevermind.

Critical reception

Heather Phares of AllMusic gave a review: "The soundtrack to the third season of the Disney Channel series Shake It Up. I Heart Dance features more hip-hop-tinged dance pop, CeCe Jones (Bella Throne) and Rocky Blue (Zendaya) sing and dance as backup dancers on Shake It Up, Chicago. Highlights include Thorne and Zendaya's fizzy duet "This is My Dance Floor", Zendaya's energetic "Beat of My Drum", Dove Cameron's "Future Sounds Like Us" and Olivia Holt's "These Boots Are Made for Walkin". Tracks by Selena Gomez, Coco Jones and Bridgit Mendler round out a collection sure to get the Radio Disney set moving".

Commercial performance
The soundtrack reached number 26 in the Billboard 200 in the U.S. as well as the Kid Albums at number 1 and the Top Soundtracks at number 2. The album was the eighth best-selling soundtrack album of 2013, with 134,000 copies sold in the United States. In Spain, it reached at number 23 in the chart.

"This Is My Dance Floor", performed by Thorne and Zendaya, peaked at number two on Billboard Kid Digital Songs. "Blow the System", performed by Thorne, reached at twenty. "Contagious Love", performed by Thorne and Zendaya, peaked at two. "These Boots Are Made for Walkin'", performed by Olivia Holt, reached number six. "Beat of My Drum", performed by Zendaya, peaked at eight.

Singles
"Contagious Love" was released as lead single on February 14, 2013 to promote the album. The song was performed on Shake It Up.

Track listing

Charts

Weekly charts

Year-end charts

Release history

References

Shake It Up (American TV series)
2013 soundtrack albums
Pop soundtracks
Television soundtracks
Walt Disney Records soundtracks